Manuel Frédéric Cabit (born 3 June 1993) is a Martiniquais former professional footballer who played as a left-back.

In June 2017, he received a call up to the Martinique national team's preliminary 2017 CONCACAF Gold Cup squad, but was left out the final roster.

Club career
After making his semi-professional debut in the French lower divisions for Aubervilliers, he moved to Chambly before a spell with Belfort and Béziers.

Ajaccio
Cabit joined full professional team AC Ajaccio on 21 July 2016. He made his professional debut in the following weeks, in a 2–1 Ligue 2 victory against Troyes.

During the 2017–18 season, his impressive form helped Ajaccio reach the Ligue 2 promotion playoffs final, however the club lost against Ligue 1 side Toulouse in the final over two legs in May 2018, for Toulouse to remain in Ligue 1.

Metz
Cabit moved to Metz on 13 June 2019 on a three-year contract. In November 2019 he was seriously injured in a car crash which also involved team-mate Kévin N'Doram, who was not hurt. He never played for Metz for the remainder of his contract and retired after it expired.

International career
Cabit is eligible to represent both Martinique national football team and France national football team.

In June 2017, he was called up to a 40-man preliminary squad for Martinique national football team for the 2017 CONCACAF Gold Cup, however he was left out of the final 23 man squad.

References

External links
 
 
 Manuel Cabit foot-national.com Profile

1993 births
Living people
Association football defenders
French footballers
Martiniquais footballers
French people of Martiniquais descent
Black French sportspeople
Ligue 1 players
Ligue 2 players
Championnat National players
FCM Aubervilliers players
ASM Belfort players
AS Béziers (2007) players
AC Ajaccio players
FC Metz players